The 1993–94 Gamma Ethniki was the 11th season since the official establishment of the third tier of Greek football in 1983. Paniliakos and Panserraikos were crowned champions in Southern and Northern Group respectively, thus winning promotion to Beta Ethniki. Ialysos Rodos and Anagennisi Kolindros also won promotion as a runners-up of the groups.

Panarkadikos, Irodotos, Keratsini, Rodos, Erani Filiatra, Patras, Nigrita, Makedonikos, Keravnos Kolchikou, Ethnikos Alexandroupoli, Asteras Ambelokipoi and Nestos Chrysoupoli were relegated to Delta Ethniki.

Southern Group

League table

Northern Group

League table

References

Third level Greek football league seasons
3
Greece